Refugio is a station on line 1 of the Guadalajara light rail system in the Guadalajara Metropolitan Area, Mexico. The station is located in the city centre, just north of the Parish Church of Our Lady of Refuge (La Parroquia de Nuestra Señora del Refugio) on Del Federalismo between Joaquín Angulo and Herrera y Cairo streets.

References

Guadalajara light rail system Line 1 stations
1976 establishments in Mexico
Railway stations opened in 1989
Railway stations located underground in Mexico
Railway stations in Guadalajara